"Give Me Your Hand (Best Song Ever)" is the lead single by the Ready Set off of his album, The Bad & The Better. It was released digitally and to mainstream radio on May 18, 2012. The song was used in the soundtrack for the film Escape from Planet Earth and the trailer for The Smurfs 2. A remix to the song by Jump Smokers was also released in 2012.

Background and composition 
"Give Me Your Hand (Best Song Ever) is a dance-pop song about a man and his girlfriend, and how she said a song he played for her was the "Best song ever", resulting in it being their song. The song musically has dance and pop influences with breakdowns after the choruses. The song was produced by Andrew Goldstein.

A teaser for the song was released on May 15, 2012. The song was made available for streaming via Alternative Press on May 17, until being released as an official single the following day.

Commercial performance 
"Give Me Your Hand" peaked at number 30 on the US Mainstream Top 40, remaining on the chart for 12 weeks. The song peaked at number 33 on the New Zealand Top 40 and stayed 2 weeks on the chart.

Music video 
A music video for the song was released to digital outlets on October 4, 2012. The video was directed by Matt Alonzo.

Storyline 
The music video starts out with Witzigrueter and his friends getting ready for a party. It also shows girls getting ready at a different house. It then shows Jordan and his friends walking to the party, as well as their female counterparts doing the same. The rest of the video features heavy partying and Jordan singing in the crowded house.

Reception 
"Give Me Your Hand (Best Song Ever)" has been well received by music critics. MTV's Jenna Rubenstein described the song as "...the brightest, sunniest, catchiest, most radio-friendly pop song you've ever heard..." and compared it to Owl City and Carly Rae Jepsen's song Good Time.

Track listing
Digital download

Charts

Release history

References

2011 songs
2012 singles
Sire Records singles
Songs written by Simon Wilcox
Songs written by Andrew Goldstein (musician)